Ariana Grande at the BBC is a BBC television special featuring Ariana Grande. Grande performed thirteen songs during the hour-long special, and was interviewed by Davina McCall. The program was announced on 31 August 2018, recorded on 6 September, and aired on 1 November.

Program
Grande performed the following songs, backed by an all-female orchestra:

 "No Tears Left to Cry"
 "Dangerous Woman"
 "Breathin"
 "Goodnight n Go"
 "R.E.M"
 "Only 1"
 "God Is a Woman"
 "Love Me Harder"
 "One Last Time"

Grande also performed "Better Off", "Pete Davidson", "Get Well Soon", and a cover of "Them Changes" by Thundercat during the recording, however these performances weren't shown on the special. However, an edited version of the special where the removed songs were shown while the interviews were cut out was shown on international TV broadcasts and platforms.

During the interview, Grande and McCall discussed a variety of topics, including the May 2017 Manchester Arena bombing, her new album Sweetener, as well as the singer's mental health.

Broadcast and reception
The special was broadcast on BBC One on 1 November 2018. According to the BBC, at least 1.4 million viewed the program. Adam White of The Telegraph rated the special four out of five stars.

The special, which was known as Ariana Grande Live in London outside of the United Kingdom, was also aired in various countries across the world.

Credits and personnel
The special was produced by Livewire Pictures, with Anouk Fontaine and Guy Freeman serving as executive producer and Colin Farquhar as producer. It was directed by Richard Valentine. The program was commissioned by Jan Younghusband and Charlotte Moore.

See also

 2018 in British television

References

External links
 

2018 in British television
2018 television specials
Ariana Grande
BBC Television shows
British television specials
Music television specials